Platycopia is a genus of Arthropods in the family Platycopiidae. There are about eight described species in Platycopia.

Species
These eight species belong to the genus Platycopia:
 Platycopia compacta Ohtsuka, Soh & Ueda, 1998
 Platycopia inornata Fosshagen, 1972
 Platycopia orientalis Ohtsuka & Boxshall, 1994
 Platycopia perplexa G. O. Sars, 1911
 Platycopia pygmaea G. O. Sars, 1919
 Platycopia robusta Andronov, 1985
 Platycopia sarsi M. S. Wilson, 1946
 Platycopia tumida (C. B. Wilson, 1935)

References

Further reading

 

Copepods
Articles created by Qbugbot